Donald Woods (1933–2001) was a South African journalist and activist.

Donald or Don Woods may also refer to:

 Donald Woods (actor) (1906–1998), Canadian-born American film and television actor
 Donald Devereux Woods (1912–1964), British microbiologist
 Don Woods (programmer) (born 1954), computer programmer and co-author of the game Colossal Cave Adventure
 Don Woods (American football) (born 1951), American football player
 Don Woods (meteorologist) (1928–2012), American weatherman

See also
Donald Wood (1933–2015), Canadian politician, businessman and farmer
Donald Wood-Smith, professor and doctor